Live is the second live album by The Northern Pikes released in 2000. The album was released independently.

In 1999, Virgin Records asked the band members for their input on a "greatest hits" package. The band decided to do a short promotional tour following the release of Hits and Assorted Secrets 1984-1993, but found themselves enjoying the more relaxed independence of making their own schedule that they continued touring. 

The album Live was recorded on this tour over three nights in April 2000 in North Bay, ON, Wakefield, PQ, and Toronto, ON. It featured the song "Out of Love" which was unreleased at the time but would appear on their next studio album, Truest Inspiration.

Track listing

"Better Twice" (from Secrets of the Alibi, 1988)
"Green Fields" (from Snow in June, 1990)
"Believe" (from Neptune, 1992)
"Wait For Me" (from Secrets of the Alibi, 1988)
"Out Of Love" (from Truest Inspiration, 2001)
"Jackie T" (from Big Blue Sky, 1987)
"Kiss Me You Fool" (from Snow in June, 1990)
"Snow In June" (from Snow in June, 1990)

Note: "Kiss Me You Fool" contains an excerpt from "Hole in My Heart" by Shannon Lyon from his album Tales of a Yellow Heart (1997)

Album credits

Personnel
Jay Semko - Vocals, Bass
Merl Bryck - Vocals, Guitar
Bryan Potvin - Vocals, Guitar
Don Schmid - Drums, Percussion

Production
Recorded by Corey Parmenter
Mixed by Peter Moore

The Northern Pikes albums
2000 live albums